Rodrigo Luis Ramallo Cornejo (born 14 October 1990) is a Bolivian footballer who plays as a striker for Club Aurora and the Bolivia national team.

He is the son of the famous Bolivian former striker William Ramallo.

Career

International career
Just like his father before him, Ramallo has played for the Bolivia national team since 2013 and has, as of 29 March 2021, earned a total of seventeen caps, scoring three goals. He has represented his country in six FIFA World Cup qualification matches, as well as at the Copa América Centenario.

International goals
Scores and results list Bolivia's goal tally first.

References

External links
 
 
 

1990 births
Living people
Sportspeople from Santa Cruz de la Sierra
Association football forwards
Bolivian footballers
Bolivian expatriate footballers
Bolivia international footballers
The Strongest players
C.D. Jorge Wilstermann players
Esporte Clube Vitória players
Club San José players
Club Always Ready players
Bolivian Primera División players
Campeonato Brasileiro Série A players
2021 Copa América players
Bolivian expatriate sportspeople in Brazil
Expatriate footballers in Brazil